USA-206, also GPS SVN-50, PRN-05 and NAVSTAR 64 and known before launch as GPS IIR-21, GPS IIRM-8 or GPS IIR-21(M), is an American navigation satellite which forms part of the Navstar Global Positioning System. It was the twenty-first and last Block IIR GPS satellite to be launched, and the eighth to use the modernized IIRM configuration.

GPS IIR-21 was built by Lockheed Martin, based on the AS-4000 satellite bus, with the navigation payload being built by ITT. It was launched by a United Launch Alliance Delta II rocket, using the 7925-9.5 configuration, on 17 August 2009 at 10:35 GMT. It was the last spacecraft to launch from Space Launch Complex 17A at the Cape Canaveral Air Force Station, a launch pad which was first used in August 1957 for test flights of the PGM-17 Thor missile. It is also the final flight of an AS-4000 bus, the final GPS launch on a Delta II, and the final Delta II launch to be overseen by the US Air Force.

Following separation from its carrier rocket, GPS IIR-21 received its USA designation, USA-206. It was deployed into a transfer orbit, from which raised itself to a semi-synchronous medium Earth orbit on 19 August, using an onboard Star 37FM apogee motor. It is a  satellite, and is expected to operate for at least ten years. Once it had completed on-orbit testing, it began covering Slot 3 of Plane E of the GPS constellation, replacing USA-126, or GPS IIA-26, which was launched in July 1996. It was declared operational on 27 August 2009.

References

Spacecraft launched in 2009
GPS satellites
Spacecraft launched by Delta II rockets
USA satellites